Anthony Hartsook is a state representative from Parker, Colorado. A Republican, Hartsook represents Colorado House of Representatives District 44, which includes the Douglas County communities of Parker, Stonegate, Sierra Ridge, Meridian Village, and Stepping Stone.

Background
Hartsook served for 26 years in the United States Army, retiring as a lieutenant colonel. During his service, he was deployed to both Iraq and Afghanistan. Together with his wife, he has owned and run a small business in Parker for ten years.

Elections
In the 2022 Colorado House of Representatives election, Hartsook defeated his Democratic Party and Libertarian Party opponents, winning 57.20% of the total votes cast.

References

External links
 Legislative website
 Campaign website

21st-century American politicians
Living people
Republican Party members of the Colorado House of Representatives
People from Parker, Colorado
United States Army officers
Businesspeople from Colorado
Northern Arizona University alumni
 Central Michigan University alumni
Year of birth missing (living people)